Zhang Xindong (born 6 February 1969) is a Chinese sport shooter who competed in the 1992 Summer Olympics and in the 1996 Summer Olympics.

References

1969 births
Living people
Chinese male sport shooters
Skeet shooters
Olympic shooters of China
Shooters at the 1992 Summer Olympics
Shooters at the 1996 Summer Olympics
Shooters at the 1994 Asian Games
Shooters at the 1998 Asian Games
Asian Games medalists in shooting
Asian Games silver medalists for China
Medalists at the 1994 Asian Games
Medalists at the 1998 Asian Games
20th-century Chinese people